Two-phase may refer to:

Two-phase electric power
Two-phase commit protocol
Two-phase flow
Two-phase locking
Binary phase, chemical compounds composed of two elements